Chita Northwest is an air base in Russia located 5 km northwest of Chita. It is also informally called "Cheryomushki". Located on Chita's north side, this base contains a number of hangars and ramp areas. It is not to be confused with Chita Kadala Airport 10 km to its southwest.

The 2nd Independent Aviation Squadron of the National Guard of Russia is based at the field, operating Mil Mi-8MTV-2 helicopters as part of the service's Siberian Regional Command. The base is also home to the 810 Aviation Repair Plant which performs aviation maintenance on helicopters.

See also
 List of airports in Russia

References

Soviet Air Force bases
Russian Air Force bases